The 2000–01 season are the Esteghlal Football Club's 9th season in the Azadegan League, and their 7th consecutive season in the top division of Iranian football. They are also competing in the Hazfi Cup and Asian Cup Winners' Cup, and 56th year in existence as a football club.

Player
As of 1 September 2001.

Pre-season and friendlies

Competitions

Overview

Azadegan League

Standings

Results summary

Results by round

Matches

Hazfi Cup

Round of 32

Round of 16

1/8 finals

Quarterfinals

Semifinal

Asian Cup Winners' Cup

First round

Second round

Quarterfinals

Semifinals

Third place match

See also
 2000–01 Azadegan League
 2000–01 Hazfi Cup
 2000–01 Asian Cup Winners' Cup

References

External links
 RSSSF

2000-01
Iranian football clubs 2000–01 season